Hrabová Roztoka is a village and municipality in Snina District in the Prešov Region of north-eastern Slovakia.

History
In historical records the village was first mentioned in 1568.

Geography
The municipality lies at an altitude of 410 metres and covers an area of 7.452 km2. It has a population of about 67 people.

References

External links
 
https://web.archive.org/web/20070513023228/http://www.statistics.sk/mosmis/eng/run.html

Villages and municipalities in Snina District
Zemplín (region)